James Balagizi (born 20 September 2003) is an English footballer who plays as a midfielder for Liverpool.

Early life
Born in Manchester, Balagizi started his career with Liverpool, before joining Manchester City at the age of six. After Manchester City decided against enrolling him at St Bede's College, Balagizi and his family decided to return to Liverpool, and he rejoined at under-11 level for a compensation fee of £9,000.

Club career
Balagizi progressed well through the youth ranks at Liverpool, and is seen as one of their brightest prospects, despite a string of injuries limiting his youth team development. He signed his first professional contract in September 2020.

He was named on the bench for the senior squad for the first time in a 3–0 EFL Cup win over Norwich City in September 2021.

On 30 June 2022, Balagizi signed for Crawley Town on a season long loan. He was recalled to Liverpool on 20 January 2023 after sustaining an injury, having made sixteen appearances and scored three goals for Crawley.

International career
Balagizi was born in England and is of Zimbabwean and DR Congolese descent. He has represented England at numerous youth levels.

On 21 September 2022, Balagizi made his England U20 debut as a substitute during a 3-0 victory over Chile at the Pinatar Arena.

Career statistics
.

Honours
Liverpool Academy
 Lancashire Senior Cup: 2021-22

References

2003 births
Living people
Footballers from Manchester
English footballers
England youth international footballers
English sportspeople of Democratic Republic of the Congo descent
English people of Zimbabwean descent
Association football midfielders
Manchester City F.C. players
Liverpool F.C. players
Crawley Town F.C. players
English Football League players